Betamethasone benzoate is a synthetic glucocorticoid corticosteroid and a corticosteroid ester.

References

Benzoate esters
Corticosteroid esters
Glucocorticoids